The 1995 USWISL, also known as the 1995 Nike W League for sponsorship reasons,  was the inaugural season of the United States Women's Interregional Soccer League (USWISL), which later became the USL W-League. Operated by the USISL, it was the highest division of women's soccer in the United States at the time. The Long Island Lady Riders were crowned champions after defeating the Southern California Nitemares in the Championship game.

Background  
In December 1993, it was announced that the USISL had committed to establishing the first US-wide women's soccer league, and that it would begin operations in 1995. In 1994, in preparation for the following year, around eighteen teams were established with the purpose of playing a few exhibition games with each other under the USISL umbrella. Five of these teams were then invited to a final tournament in Trinity, North Carolina, which was won by the Sacramento Storm, who defeated the Greensboro Dynamo 1–0 in the Championship game.

The league was originally meant to include 20 teams, but only 19 entered the competition; moreover, the Wichita Lady Blues and the Tulsa Roughnecks folded early in the year, thus bringing the number of competing teams down to 17, divided into three divisions (Eastern, Central, and Western).

Competition format 
The league did not follow the standard FIFA points system; instead, points were awarded as follows:
 Regulation win (W) = 6 points
 Shootout win (SW) = 4 points
 Shootout loss (SL) = 2 points
 Regulation loss (L) = 0 points
 Bonus points (BP): An additional one point per goal, up to a maximum of three points per game.

League standings

Eastern Division

Central Division

Western Division

Sizzlin' Six Tournament 
The Sizzlin' Six Tournament took place in Cincinnati, Ohio from August 11 to August 13, 1995. The Cincinnati Leopards qualified automatically as the hosts of the tournament. Having won their respective divisions, the Long Island Lady Riders (Eastern), the Rockford Dactyls (Central), and the Southern California Nitemares (Western) also qualified for the tournament. The Pennsylvania Freedom and the Texas Lightning, who finished second in the Eastern and Central divisions respectively, took the remaining two spots.

The six qualified teams played in a modified round-robin tournament, with each team playing games on August 11 and 12 against two non-division opponents. The Championship game was played on August 13, 1995.

Championship

Statistical leaders

Top scorers

Awards 
 Scoring Champion: Charmaine Hooper (Rockford Dactyls)
 Most Valuable Player: Laurie Hill (Southern California Nitemares)
 Coach of the Year: Peter Collins Jr. (Long Island Lady Riders)
 Goalkeeper of the Year: Kim Wyant (Long Island Lady Riders)
 Sizzlin' Six Tournament Offensive MVP: Gina Vassallo-Tucker (Long Island Lady Riders)
 Sizzlin' Six Tournament Defensive MVP: Kim Conway (Long Island Lady Riders)

References 

USL W-League (1995–2015) seasons
1995 in American soccer leagues
1995 in American women's soccer